Arthur Herbert "Slim" Evans (24 April 1890 – 13 February 1944) was a leader in the industrial labor union movement in Canada and the United States. He is most known for leading the On To Ottawa Trek. Evans was involved in the Industrial Workers of the World, the One Big Union, and the Worker's Unity League. He was a member of the Communist Party of Canada.

Personal life
Evans was born in Toronto in 1890. At age 13, he left school to support his family. He worked numerous jobs, including horse driver and carpenter. Evans travelled west in 1911 and worked in various places, first as a farmer, then worked again as a carpenter in Winnipeg, Minneapolis and Kansas City.

On 4 August 1920, Arthur "Slim" Evans married Ethel (last name unknown) who he had met while organizing miners in Drumheller, Alberta. On 13 April 1922, the couple had their first child, a son named Stewart. Stewart Evans died in 1925 during the diphtheria epidemic in Vancouver. They had a second child, Jean Stewart Evans, on 12 February 1927. Jean would go on to write "Work and Wages!", a biography of her father.

Wobblies 
In Minneapolis he became involved with the Industrial Workers of the World, (IWW, or "Wobblies"). He led an IWW free speech rally in Minneapolis where he was arrested for participating and sentenced to three years in jail. Evans later recalled: "All I did was read it. I was too shy and too nervous at that time to make up any speech of my own." In 1912, he led a strike of political prisoners resulting in his release.

He was present at the 1913 miners' strike in Ludlow, Colorado. There he met IWW leaders "Big" Bill Haywood, Frank Little, and the legendary Joe Hill. Two days after Evans arrived, strikebreakers hired by John D. Rockefeller, owner of the coal mines, attacked the striker's camp, killing 20 people including 12 children in the Ludlow Massacre. Evans was shot in the leg with a machine gun. He walked with a limp for the rest of his life as a result.

Evans returned to Canada and continued his union activism. He was the leader of the One Big Union local of coal miners in Drumheller, Alberta. He led a strike of 6,300 One Big Union miners during the Canadian Labour Revolt in 1919. It was there he met his future wife Ethel, daughter of a Drumheller miner who had been involved in organizing the union. The strike was suppressed by anti-union mercenaries hired by the mining company. Because the One Big Union was not a recognized union, and workers were official organized within the United Mine Workers, Evans had technically organized a 'wild cat' strike without permission. Evans used UMWA funds for the strike, he was accused of embezzlement and sentenced to a three year prison term. Upon a petition from the workers he supposedly embezzled from, Evans was released.

Evans, along with other former wobblies, became a member of the Communist Party of Canada after it formed in 1921. Evans officially became a party member in 1926.

Worker's Unity League
The Worker's Unity League was the official trade union centre of the Communist Party of Canada. Like the IWW and OBU which Evans had previously organized in, the Worker's Unity League was an industrial union. Evans was a major organizer within the union.

Princeton coal miner's strike 
In 1932, coal miners saw their wages cut by 10% in Princeton, British Columbia. The miners contacted the Worker's Unity League, which sent Evans to organize a union for them in September 1932. The company refused to negotiate with the union, so the workers voted to strike. Evans advised the workers to wait until December to strike, because the demand for coal would be much higher. The strike began on 22 December. British Columbia's attorney general dispatched a crops of 40 RCMP officers to monitor Evans and suppress the strike. Officers assaulted the striking miners with batons, along with their families, while they were picketing. The Ku Klux Klan burned crosses, beat strikers, and sent threatening letters, in the name of anti-communism.

Evans was arrested under Section 98, which allows arbitrary detainment of suspected communists,. He was imprisoned in far off Oakella Prison where he did hard-labour before being released on bail. During his imprisonment, his wife and daughter were evicted from the home Evan's had built for them. Following his release, Evans was kidnapped by off duty police constables and klansmen. A convoy of armed cars took him to Vancouver. The kidnappers threatened:  "take warning and move on or suffer the consequences". Evans immediately booked a train back to Princeton, where he led the strike to success, winning workers higher pay and improved workplace safety. Evans was once again arrested under Section 98, and sentenced to one year in prison without bail. He rejected the legitimacy of the trial and instead of defending himself he sang The Internationale.

On-to-Ottawa trek

In 1935  Evans led the On-to-Ottawa Trek. Communist activists including Evans had organized workers in the government relief camps into the Relief Camp Workers' Union three years previously in 1932. Relief camp workers struck on April 4, 1935, when they went to Vancouver, where they stayed and pressed their demands until the Trek began on June 3. The first batch of strikers left Vancouver, riding on boxcars, and were joined by many others in Kamloops, Field, Golden, Calgary and Moose Jaw. By the time they reached Regina, Saskatchewan their numbers had climbed to over 2,000. Evans led a delegation to go ahead of the strikers and meet with the prime minister, R. B. "Iron Heel" Bennett. The two leaders engaged in a heated exchange, when Bennett accused Evans of being an embezzler. Evans' response received much publicity:

The meeting accomplished little more than to illustrate the intransigence of the government and the determination of the strikers, and the delegation left Ottawa to rejoin the strikers in Regina.

Evans and other Trek leaders were arrested at a large demonstration of strikers and supporters on July 1, 1935, (Dominion Day, or Canada Day, as it is now called), which precipitated the Regina Riot. The federal government had decided that the Trek would be forcibly stopped in Regina because of fears that it would gain momentum if allowed to reach Winnipeg that could turn it from a protest into a revolutionary movement.

Evans was charged under Section 98, the section of the Criminal Code, which had been added in the aftermath of the Winnipeg General Strike outlawing membership in revolutionary organizations. An exhaustive government inquiry was held into causes of the riot, and its conclusions paved the way for reforming the relief camp system. This outcome and the overwhelming defeat of R. B. Bennett are two indicators that the strike was a success, even though the Trek was crushed.

Later organizing 
Evans continued his union activism, organizing the miners and smelter workers in Trail, British Columbia, into the CIO union, Mine, Mill, and Smelters Union. While organizing the smelters, his car was torched by the mine owners. He also led fundraising drives for the Mackenzie-Papineau Battalion, the volunteer contingent from Canada that fought the fascists during the Spanish Civil War. His last union position was as the shop steward at the Vancouver Shipyards.

Death
He died in Vancouver on February 13, 1944, aged 53. After leaving a street car, he was struck by a car crossing between streets Kingsway and Joyce.

References

1890 births
1944 deaths
People from the Regional District of Kootenay Boundary
People from Minneapolis
People from Old Toronto
Pedestrian road incident deaths
Industrial Workers of the World members
Canadian trade unionists
Canadian communists
Canadian people of Welsh descent
Canadian expatriates in the United States
Road incident deaths in Canada
Accidental deaths in British Columbia
Trade unionists from Ontario
One Big Union (Canada) members